The Shachi-class (Project 21) was a class of naval offshore patrol vessels supposed to be built by Reliance Defence and Engineering (formerly known as Pipavav Defence and Offshore Engineering Company Limited) at its shipyard in Indian state of Gujarat. The project was scrapped by Ministry of Defense, India after an inordinate delay of 9 years.

Development
In June 2010, it was reported that Pipavav Shipyard won a contract from the Indian Ministry of Defence to build five naval offshore patrol vessels for the Indian Navy. On 27 May 2011, the contract worth  was signed with the delivery of the first ship scheduled for November 2014 and the remaining ships in intervals of six months each. 

Initially, the vessels were planned to be built to a design sourced from Severnoye Design Bureau. However, talks with Severnoye broke down over differences in pricing and a new design partner, reported to be Alion Science, was chosen.

There have been numerous delays in the project, initially due to change of design partner and subsequently due to financial issues of the shipyard and acquisition of Pipavav Shipyard by Reliance. In June 2016, it was reported that the shipyard is accelerating work on the delayed order with a shorter delivery schedule for the last three ships. As of March 2018, the ships are scheduled for delivery between June 2018 and June 2020. In December 2018, it was reported that bank guarantees of over  had been encashed by the Indian Navy.

In October 2020, the Indian Navy cancelled the deal to acquire offshore petrol vessels due to 10 year delay in their delivery and the heavy indebtedness of the contractor.

Ships of the class
Two ships of the first batch, Shachi and Shruti, were launched on 25 July 2017.

References

Patrol vessels of the Indian Navy
Patrol ship classes